{{Infobox boxer
| image =Eder Jofre (1970).tif
| caption = Jofre in 1970
| name = Eder Jofre
| realname= Eder Jofre
| nationality = Brazilian
| nickname = "Galinho de Ouro" ("Little Golden Rooster")"Jofrinho" <small>("Lil Jofre")</small>
| height = 1.63 m
| reach = 
| weight = BantamweightFeatherweight
| birth_date = 
| birth_place = São Paulo, Brazil
| death_date = 
| death_place = Embu das Artes, Brazil
| style = Orthodox
| total = 78
| wins = 72
| KO = 50
| losses = 2
| draws = 4
| no contests = 
}}Eder Jofre''' (26 March 1936 – 2 October 2022) was a Brazilian professional boxer and architect who was both bantamweight and featherweight world champion.

In 2019, he was voted the 16th greatest boxer of all-time, which made him the third greatest living boxer (behind only Roberto Durán and Sugar Ray Leonard) by "The International Boxing Research Organization". In 2002, he was named the 19th greatest fighter of the past 80 years by The Ring magazine. In 1996, he was rated the 9th greatest boxer of the previous 50 years. He is ranked #85 on Ring Magazine's 100 Greatest Punchers Of All Time list.

In 1992, Jofre was inducted into the International Boxing Hall of Fame in Canastota, New York, and remains the only Brazilian thus honored.

 Amateur career 
Jofre represented his native country at the 1956 Summer Olympics in Melbourne, Australia.

 Olympic results 
 First-round bye
 Defeated Thein Myint (Burma) on points
 Lost to Claudio Barrientos (Chile) on points

 Professional career 
Éder Jofre, a son of Aristides Jofre, whose nicknames (Eder's) were "Galinho de Ouro" (="Golden Bantam") and "Jofrinho", made his professional debut on 23 March 1957, beating Raul Lopez by knockout in five rounds. He had twelve fights in 1957, including two each against Lopez, Osvaldo Perez, and Ernesto Miranda, the last of whom against whom Jofre sustained his first two record stains: two ten-round draws (ties).

In 1958, Jofre won four more fights, and then, on 14 May of that year, he had his first fight abroad, drawing in ten rounds against Ruben Caceres in Montevideo, Uruguay. On 14 November, Jose Smecca became the only man to drop Jofre in his career; Jofre got up from a first-round knockdown to knock Smecca out in seven rounds.

Jofre won eight fights in 1959, including one against two-time world title challenger Leo Espinoza and a seventh-round knockout in a rematch with Caceres.

On 19 February 1960, he fought Ernesto Miranda for the third time, this time with the South American Bantamweight title on the line. Jofre outpointed Miranda over fifteen rounds to win his first title as a professional. Jofre retained the title with a knockout in three rounds in the fourth fight with Miranda, and, after one more win, he made his U.S. debut, defeating top-ranked challenger Jose Medel by knockout in ten rounds on 16 August in Los Angeles. Next, he defeated the power-punching Ricardo Moreno (later ranked among boxing's all-time best punchers by Ring Magazine), by a knockout in the sixth round.

On 18 November of that year, Jofre became world champion, when he knocked out Eloy Sanchez in six rounds, in Los Angeles, to claim the vacant WBA World Bantamweight title.

Jofre proved to be a busy world champion, fighting top-notch fighters, both in title engagements and in non-title fights. From 1960 to 1965, he retained his title against Piero Rollo, Ramon Arias (in Caracas, Venezuela), Johnny Caldwell, Herman Marques, Jose Medel, Katsuyoshi Aoki (in Tokyo), Johnny Jamito (in Manila), and Bernardo Caraballo (in Bogotá, Colombia).

In addition, he defeated such fighters as Billy Peacock, Sadao Yaoita, and Fernando Soto in non-title bouts. After the fight with Aoki, Jofre was also recognized as World Bantamweight Champion by the WBC, therefore, becoming the Undisputed World Champion.

On 17 May 1965, his streak as an undefeated fighter was broken when he lost to "Fighting Harada" by a controversial fifteen-round split decision in Nagoya, Japan, to lose the world Bantamweight title.

After losing to Harada by unanimous decision at a rematch held in Tokyo on 1 June 1966, Jofre retired.

In 1969, he made a comeback, beating Rudy Corona by a knockout in six rounds on 26 August. After winning thirteen fights in a row, he challenged for a world title once again: on 5 May 1973, he fought Jose Legra for the Lineal and WBC featherweight titles, in Brasilia. Jofre became a two-division world champion by defeating Legra with a fifteen-round majority decision.

Despite having won his second world title, Jofre realized he was nearing the end of the road as far as his boxing career was concerned. He defeated Frankie Crawford in a non-title affair and defended his world Featherweight title against fellow former world Bantamweight champion Vicente Saldivar of Mexico, in a "super fight" held at Salvador. He knocked Saldivar out in four rounds.After a string of fights against lesser opponents, he retired, having beaten the Mexican Octavio Gomez by a unanimous but controversial decision (120 – 110 by judge Antonio Di, 119 – 115 by judge Adriano Carollo and 117 – 116 by judge Américo Vieira) in São Paulo on 8 October 1976. In this last fight, Jofre was slow and uncertain, and himself put in doubt the correctness of the arbiter's decision ("Digam o que disserem, eu não venci Famoso Gomez" he said ti the Rio de Janeiro newspaper O Globo).

Jofre had a record of 72–2–4 (50 KOs), making him a member of the exclusive group of boxers who have won 50 or more fights by knockout.

 After boxing 
Jofre worked in politics, serving as an alderman for the city of São Paulo for 16 years. He then worked for DERSA, a state-owned company, working with the highways of São Paulo. In 2004, a DVD of Jofre's life titled "O Grande Campeão" was released. On Jofre's 85th birthday, in 2021, the first English language biography of his life was released. The book titled "Eder Jofre: Brazil's First Boxing World Champion", by family friend and author Christopher J. Smith won the "'Book of the Year'" at the "West Coast Boxing Hall of Fame" in October 2021 at the Loews Hotel in Hollywood, California. Present at the event was Jofre and his son, Marcel, and daughter, Andrea. Jofre was in Los Angeles to be inducted into the "West Coast Boxing Hall of Fame" and on this trip he re-visited the site of his bantamweight world title victory, The Olympic Auditorium - his first visit to the venue since that evening on 18 November 1960.

 Exhibitions and calisthenics 
Jofre occasionally came out of retirement to fight exhibitions. Some of his more noteworthy exhibitions were against Servilio de Oliveira and Alexis Arguello. In 2010, at age 74, Jofre, a physical fitness fanatic who was still the reflection of great health, put out a calisthenics video.

 Vegetarianism 
Jofre was a vegetarian.Myler, Patrick. (1998). A Century of Boxing Greats: Inside the Ring with the Hundred Best Boxers. Robson/Parkwest. p. 173. He has been described as one of the few vegetarians ever to win a boxing world championship. He became a vegetarian at the age of 20 after reading a book that stated meat consumption was unhealthy for the body. Jofre adhered to his strict vegetarian diet from the age of 20 and commented in 2019 "I even feel disgust today when I see people eating meat... I eat pasta, rice and beans, boiled potatoes or fried and very sporadically egg. I drink milk, yogurt, curds, and honey".

Illness and death
Jofre suffered from chronic traumatic encephalopathy. He was hospitalized in March 2022 at a clinic in Embu das Artes because of pneumonia. He died on 2 October due to complications from the disease. He was 86.

 Professional boxing record 

{|class="wikitable" style="text-align:center"
|-
!
!Result
!Record
!Opponent
!Type
!Round, time
!Date
!Location
!Notes
|-align=center
|78
| Win
|72–2–4
|align=left|Octavio Gomez
|UD
|12
|1976-10-08
|align=left|
|align=left|
|-align=center
|77
| Win
|71–2–4
|align=left|Juan Antonio López
|UD
|10
|1976-08-13
|align=left|
|align=left|
|-align=center
|76
| Win
|70–2–4
|align=left|Jose Antonio Jimenez
|UD
|10
|1976-07-02
|align=left|
|align=left|
|-align=center
|75
| Win
|69–2–4
|align=left|Pasqualino Morbidelli
|KO
|4 (10), 
|1976-05-29
|align=left|
|align=left|
|-align=center
|74
| Win
|68–2–4
|align=left|Michel Lefevbre
|KO
|3 (10), 
|1976-05-02
|align=left|
|align=left|
|-align=center
|73
| Win
|67–2–4
|align=left|Enzo Farinelli
|KO
|4 (10)
|1976-02-24
|align=left|
|align=left|
|-align=center
|72
| Win
|66–2–4
|align=left|Niliberto Herrera
|UD
|10
|1975-01-03
|align=left|
|align=left|
|-align=center
|71
| Win
|65–2–4
|align=left|Vicente Saldivar
|KO
|4 (15)
|1973-10-21
|align=left|
|align=left|
|-align=center
|70
| Win
|64–2–4
|align=left|Frankie Crawford
|UD
|10
|1973-08-25
|align=left|
|align=left|
|-align=center
|69
| Win
|63–2–4
|align=left|Godfrey Stevens
|KO
|4 (10)
|1973-07-21
|align=left|
|align=left|
|-align=center
|68
| Win
|62–2–4
|align=left|José Legrá
|MD
|15
|1973-05-05
|align=left|
|align=left|
|-align=center
|67
| Win
|61–2–4
|align=left|Djiemai Belhadri
|KO
|3 (10)
|1972-09-29
|align=left|
|align=left|
|-align=center
|66
| Win
|60–2–4
|align=left|Shig Fukuyama
|TKO
|9 (10)
|1972-08-18
|align=left|
|align=left|
|-align=center
|65
| Win
|59–2–4
|align=left|Jose Bisbal
|KO
|2 (10)
|1972-06-30
|align=left|
|align=left|
|-align=center
|64
| Win
|58–2–4
|align=left|Felix Figueroa
|align=left|
|
|
|align=left|
|align=left|
|-align=center
|63
| Win
|57–2–4
|align=left|Guillermo Morales
|align=left|
|
|
|align=left|
|align=left|
|-align=center
|62
| Win
|56–2–4
|align=left|Robert Porcel
|align=left|
|
|
|align=left|
|align=left|
|-align=center
|61
| Win
|55–2–4
|align=left|Tony Jumao-As
|align=left|
|
|
|align=left|
|align=left|
|-align=center
|60
| Win
|54–2–4
|align=left|Domenico Chiloiro
|align=left|
|
|
|align=left|
|align=left|
|-align=center
|59
| Win
|53–2–4
|align=left|Jerry Stokes
|align=left|
|
|
|align=left|
|align=left|
|-align=center
|58
| Win
|52–2–4
|align=left|Giovanni Girgenti
|align=left|
|
|
|align=left|
|align=left|
|-align=center
|57
| Win
|51–2–4
|align=left|Roberto Wong
|align=left|
|
|
|align=left|
|align=left|
|-align=center
|56
| Win
|50–2–4
|align=left|Manny Elias
|align=left|
|
|
|align=left|
|align=left|
|-align=center
|55
| Win
|49–2–4
|align=left|Nevio Carbi
|align=left|
|
|
|align=left|
|align=left|
|-align=center
|54
| Win
|48–2–4
|align=left|Rudy Corona
|align=left|
|
|
|align=left|
|align=left|
|-align=center
|53
| Loss
|47–2–4
|align=left|Fighting Harada
|align=left|
|
|
|align=left|
|align=left|
|-align=center
|52
| Draw
|47–1–4
|align=left|Manny Elias
|align=left|
|
|
|align=left|
|align=left|
|-align=center
|51
| Loss
|47–1–3
|align=left|Fighting Harada
|align=left|
|
|
|align=left|
|align=left|
|-align=center
|50
| Win
|47–0–3
|align=left|Bernardo Caraballo
|align=left|
|
|
|align=left|
|align=left|
|-align=center
|49
| Win
|46–0–3
|align=left|Johnny Jamito
|align=left|
|
|
|align=left|
|align=left|
|-align=center
|48
| Win
|45–0–3
|align=left|Katsutoshi Aoki
|align=left|
|
|
|align=left|
|align=left|
|-align=center
|47
| Win
|44–0–3
|align=left|José Medel
|align=left|
|
|
|align=left|
|align=left|
|-align=center
|46
| Win
|43–0–3
|align=left|Herman Marques
|align=left|
|
|
|align=left|
|align=left|
|-align=center
|45
| Win
|42–0–3
|align=left|Johnny Caldwell
|align=left|
|
|
|align=left|
|align=left|
|-align=center
|44
| Win
|41–0–3
|align=left|Fernando Gonçalves
|align=left|
|
|
|align=left|
|align=left|
|-align=center
|43
| Win
|40–0–3
|align=left|Ramon Arias
|align=left|
|
|
|align=left|
|align=left|
|-align=center
|42
| Win
|39–0–3
|align=left|Sadao Yaoita
|align=left|
|
|
|align=left|
|align=left|
|-align=center
|41
| Win
|38–0–3
|align=left|Sugar Ray
|align=left|
|
|
|align=left|
|align=left|
|-align=center
|40
| Win
|37–0–3
|align=left|Piero Rollo
|align=left|
|
|
|align=left|
|align=left|
|-align=center
|39
| Win
|36–0–3
|align=left|Billy Peacock
|align=left|
|
|
|align=left|
|align=left|
|-align=center
|38
| Win
|35–0–3
|align=left|Eloy Sanchez
|align=left|
|
|
|align=left|
|align=left|
|-align=center
|37
| Win
|34–0–3
|align=left|Ricardo Moreno
|align=left|
|
|
|align=left|
|align=left|
|-align=center
|36
| Win
|33–0–3
|align=left|José Medel
|align=left|
|
|
|align=left|
|align=left|
|-align=center
|35
| Win
|32–0–3
|align=left|Claudio Barrientos
|align=left|
|
|
|align=left|
|align=left|
|-align=center
|34
| Win
|31–0–3
|align=left|Ernesto Miranda
|align=left|
|
|
|align=left|
|align=left|
|-align=center
|33
| Win
|30–0–3
|align=left|Ernesto Miranda
|align=left|
|
|
|align=left|
|align=left|
|-align=center
|32
| Win
|29–0–3
|align=left|Danny Kid
|align=left|
|
|
|align=left|
|align=left|
|-align=center
|31
| Win
|28–0–3
|align=left|Giovanni Zuddas
|align=left|
|
|
|align=left|
|align=left|
|-align=center
|30
| Win
|27–0–3
|align=left|Angel Bustos
|align=left|
|
|
|align=left|
|align=left|
|-align=center
|29
| Win
|26–0–3
|align=left|Ruben Cáceres
|align=left|
|
|
|align=left|
|align=left|
|-align=center
|28
| Win
|25–0–3
|align=left|Salustiano Suarez
|align=left|
|
|
|align=left|
|align=left|
|-align=center
|27
| Win
|24–0–3
|align=left|Angel Bustos
|align=left|
|
|
|align=left|
|align=left|
|-align=center
|26
| Win
|23–0–3
|align=left|Leo Espinosa
|align=left|
|
|
|align=left|
|align=left|
|-align=center
|25
| Win
|22–0–3
|align=left|Salustiano Suarez
|align=left|
|
|
|align=left|
|align=left|
|-align=center
|24
| Win
|21–0–3
|align=left|Aniceto Pereyra
|align=left|
|
|
|align=left|
|align=left|
|-align=center
|23
| Win
|20–0–3
|align=left|Roberto Castro
|align=left|
|
|
|align=left|
|align=left|
|-align=center
|22
| Win
|19–0–3
|align=left|Jose Smecca
|align=left|
|
|
|align=left|
|align=left|
|-align=center
|21
| Win
|18–0–3
|align=left|Jose Casas
|align=left|
|
|
|align=left|
|align=left|
|-align=center
|20
| Win
|17–0–3
|align=left|Jose Casas
|align=left|
|
|
|align=left|
|align=left|
|-align=center
|19
| Win
|16–0–3
|align=left|Roberto Olmedo
|align=left|
|
|
|align=left|
|align=left|
|-align=center
|18
| Win
|15–0–3
|align=left|Juan Carlos Acebal
|align=left|
|
|
|align=left|
|align=left|
|-align=center
|17
| Win
|14–0–3
|align=left|German Escudero
|align=left|
|
|
|align=left|
|align=left|
|-align=center
|16
| Win
|13–0–3
|align=left|German Escudero
|align=left|
|
|
|align=left|
|align=left|
|-align=center
|15
| Draw
|12–0–3
|align=left|Ruben Cáceres
|align=left|
|
|
|align=left|
|align=left|
|-align=center
|14
| Win
|12–0–2
|align=left|Cristobal Gabisans
|align=left|
|
|
|align=left|
|align=left|
|-align=center
|13
| Win
|11–0–2
|align=left|Avelino Romero
|align=left|
|
|
|align=left|
|align=left|
|-align=center
|12
| Win
|10–0–2
|align=left|Cristobal Gabisans
|align=left|
|
|
|align=left|
|align=left|
|-align=center
|11
| Win
|9–0–2
|align=left|Adolfo Ramon Pendas
|align=left|
|
|
|align=left|
|align=left|
|-align=center
|10
| Win
|8–0–2
|align=left|Luis Angel Jimenez
|align=left|
|
|
|align=left|
|align=left|
|-align=center
|9
| Draw
|7–0–2
|align=left|Ernesto Miranda
|align=left|
|
|
|align=left|
|align=left|
|-align=center
|8
| Draw
|7–0–1
|align=left|Ernesto Miranda
|align=left|
|
|
|align=left|
|align=left|
|-align=center
|7
| Win
|7–0
|align=left|Raul Jaime
|align=left|
|
|
|align=left|
|align=left|
|-align=center
|6
| Win
|6–0
|align=left|Raul Jaime
|align=left|
|
|
|align=left|
|align=left|
|-align=center
|5
| Win
|5–0
|align=left|Juan Gonzalez
|align=left|
|
|
|align=left|
|align=left|
|-align=center
|4
| Win
|4–0
|align=left|Osvaldo Perez
|align=left|
|
|
|align=left|
|align=left|
|-align=center
|3
| Win
|3–0
|align=left|Osvaldo Perez
|align=left|
|
|
|align=left|
|align=left|
|-align=center
|2
| Win
|2–0
|align=left|Raul Lopez
|align=left|
|
|
|align=left|
|align=left|
|-align=center
|1
| Win
|1–0
|align=left|Raul Lopez
|align=left|
|
|
|align=left|
|align=left|
|-align=center

 Honors 
He was a member of the International Boxing Hall of Fame.

He is listed #16 on "International Boxing Research Organization" all-time pound-for-pound list.de andrade lima Page
In 1983, at the WBC's 20th anniversary, he was voted the greatest bantamweight of all-time. He is also rated as the WBA'a all-time "super champion."

He was listed #9 on "Ring Magazine's" 50 greatest boxers of the past 50 years in 1996.

He is listed as #19 on Ring Magazine's list of the 80 Best Fighters of the Last 80 Years.

In 2003, he was listed as #85 on Ring Magazine's list of 100 greatest punchers of all time.

Jofre was ranked as the number 1 bantamweight of all-time by the International Boxing Research Organization in 2006.de andrade lima Page 

Éder Jofre is depicted in the 2018 biographical film 10 Segundos Para Vencer''. He was portrayed by Brazilian actor Daniel de Oliveira.

In October 2021, he was inducted into the West Coast Boxing Hall of Fame.

See also
List of world bantamweight boxing champions
List of world featherweight boxing champions

References

Further reading
Eder Jofre

External links

Eder Jofre - CBZ Profile

 

|-

|-

|-

1936 births
2022 deaths
Brazilian male boxers
Sportspeople from São Paulo
Brazilian people of French descent
Brazilian people of Greek descent
Brazilian people of Italian descent
Brazilian people of Portuguese descent
Olympic boxers of Brazil
Boxers at the 1956 Summer Olympics
Brazilian architects
Brazilian designers
Deaths from pneumonia in São Paulo (state)
Bantamweight boxers
Featherweight boxers
World bantamweight boxing champions
World featherweight boxing champions
World Boxing Association champions
World Boxing Council champions
The Ring (magazine) champions
International Boxing Hall of Fame inductees